Balingtai is a tourist attraction located in Pingchang County, Bazhong City, Sichuan, China. It covers an area of 108 square kilometers. Balingtai is also known as Balingzhai.

Attractions
There are 20 attractions in Balingtai: 
Baling Compound
Bashanbei Erge Group Sculpture
Beizhai Gate
Bhikkhu Tombs
Changning Village
Dongzhai Gate
Erlang Hall
Fengjiaba Pagoda
Fengjiaba Tombs
Guanlou
Lotus Terrace
Putuo Rock
Shisanya Compound
Taoshikan Cliff Statue
Wu Family Courtyard
Wujiachang Tomb
Xieliangpo Tombs
Xuanzu Temple
Yaowang Temple
Zhuyuan Tombs

References

Pingchang County